Stergios Dimopoulos (born 20 May 1990) is a Greek professional footballer who plays as a centre-back for Super League 2 club Anagennisi Karditsa.

Club career 
Dimopoulos played for Anagennisi Karditsa's youth teams from 2006 to 2009, until he moved to the first team. On 25 July 2012 he signed a 1+2 years contract with AEL 1964.

Honours
Anagennisi Karditsa
Delta Ethniki: 2011–12

Volos
Gamma Ethniki: 2017–18
Football League: 2018–19

External links
 
 sportlarissa.gr

1990 births
Living people
Greek footballers
Association football defenders
Delta Ethniki players
Football League (Greece) players
Gamma Ethniki players
Super League Greece players
Super League Greece 2 players
Anagennisi Karditsa F.C. players
Athlitiki Enosi Larissa F.C. players
Volos N.F.C. players
Levadiakos F.C. players
Footballers from Karditsa